Hollie Stevens (January 4, 1982 – July 3, 2012) was an American pornographic actress, wrestler, model, and writer. She was considered a pioneer of the porn genre known as clown porn, which features actors in clown makeup.

She debuted in 2000 as a feature dancer under the name Holly Wood and entered the adult industry in 2003, appearing in over 180 titles. Her first scene was with Bridgette Kerkove and Joel Lawrence in Mirror Image for Sin City. She was a longtime writer and model for the magazine Girls & Corpses. She appeared in the independent horror film Noirland, directed by Ramzi Abed. Stevens also was a DJ, a live visual manipulator, a kickboxing athlete, a performance artist, and a painter.

In 2011 she was diagnosed with breast cancer, and in August 2011 underwent a mastectomy. In June 2012 she married her partner, comedian and actor Eric Cash; the same month it was revealed her cancer had metastasised to her brain. She died of cancer on July 3, 2012 in San Francisco.

Awards
 2004 AVN Award winner – Best All-Girl Sex Scene, Video - The Violation of Jessica Darlin
 2004 AVN Award nominee – Best Group Sex Scene, Video - The Bachelor

References

External links

 MySpace
 
 The final days of Hollie Stevens: A first hand account from Robert Rhine, EmmReport

1982 births
2012 deaths
American DJs
American female erotic dancers
American erotic dancers
Female models from Missouri
American pornographic film actresses
21st-century American painters
American performance artists
American women performance artists
Deaths from cancer in California
Deaths from brain cancer in the United States
Deaths from breast cancer
Actresses from Kansas City, Missouri
Pornographic film actors from Missouri
American women painters
21st-century American women artists